The National League of Cities (NLC) is an advocacy organization in the United States that represents the country's 19,495 cities, towns, and villages along with 49 state municipal leagues. Created in 1924, it has evolved into a leading membership organization providing education, research, support, and advocacy to city leaders across America. Based in Washington, D.C., it is considered part of the 'Big Seven', a group of organizations that represent local and state government in the United States. The NLC provides training to municipal officials, holds conferences, lobbies and provides assistance to cities in educational issues.

NLC was first founded as the American Municipal Association in Lawrence, Kansas by a group of ten state municipal leagues seeking greater coordination and representation in national affairs. In 1947, the organization opened its membership to individual cities with populations of 100,000 or more. That membership threshold was gradually moved downward, and in 1964, to signal the organization's growing emphasis on cities as members, the American Municipal Association changed its name to the current. By 1977, the population requirement was eliminated.

Today, NLC represents over 1,900 member cities as a convening organization, support network, and representative in federal affairs. Leading priorities for the group include the economy, infrastructure, public safety, technology, education, and families.

History
The National League of Cities was founded in 1924 when 10 state municipal leagues banded together as the American Municipal Association. Over time, the organization's membership expanded to include individual cities of all sizes.

Throughout its history, NLC has played a prominent role in shaping federal urban policy and defining city issues in America. It was at a 1970 convention that William Ruckelshaus, Administrator of the newly created Environmental Protection Agency, announced an order requiring Cleveland, Detroit, and Atlanta to clean up their inadequately treated sewage discharges into rivers, thereby helping send a message that the young agency meant business.

Activities

Federal advocacy 
NLC lobbies Congress on multiple issues, including city infrastructure, particularly transportation; supporting local energy efficiency and conservation efforts; strengthening and stabilizing the housing market; helping build stable families; supporting community safety; and reforming the country's immigration system. NLC's core lobbying principles include avoiding unfunded mandates, preserving local authority and protecting the intergovernmental partnership.

Conferences 
NLC hosts the annual Congress of Cities and Exposition, at which municipal officials participate in workshops, general sessions, networking opportunities and leadership training seminars. NLC's other yearly conference is the Congressional City Conference, held each March in Washington, D.C. Thousands of municipal officials discuss NLC legislative priorities with Members of Congress and the Administration, share promising practices, discuss policy and participate in leadership training opportunities.

Programs

Institute for Youth, Education and Families 
The Institute for Youth, Education, and Families is an entity within NLC which assists municipal officials in providing services on behalf of the children, youth and families in their communities. The YEF Institute offers resources in five core program areas, including early childhood success, education and afterschool, benefits for working families, youth participation in local government and child and youth safety.

Center for City Solutions 
NLC's Center for City Solutions offers information, research, training, and educational materials on issues cities face in the present and future. Its programs include an applied research group along with the Rose Center for Public Leadership, the Sustainable Cities Institute, the City Innovation Ecosystems initiative, and the NLC University divisions.

Rose Center for Public Leadership

The Rose Center for Public Leadership was first created in 2008 as part of the Urban Land Institute by Daniel Rose, a New York real estate developer. In 2014, the ULI and the Rose family created a partnership with the NLC. Currently the NLC's Center for City Solutions runs the Rose Center.

Publications 

The National League of Cities oversees a range of publications including the blog CitiesSpeak, the newsletter The Weekly (formerly Nation's Cities Weekly), and several social media channels. NLC also produces original research on topics such as technology, education, municipal finance, public safety, and mayors' priorities.

Leadership

The National League of Cities is overseen by a board of directors, which elects a president, vice president, and second vice president in annual elections. Each president serves a one-year term, typically choosing to focus on a single program or advocacy priority such as economic mobility or public safety. The current president of the NLC is Mark Stodola, mayor of Little Rock, Arkansas, who leads an initiative on the future of work.

Past presidents of the NLC have included:
 Clarence E. Anthony, former Mayor of South Bay, Florida (president 1998-1999; named NLC executive director, 2013)
 Dennis Archer, former Mayor of Detroit, Michigan
 Charles H. Lyons,  former Selectman of Arlington, MA
 Bob Bolen, former mayor of Fort Worth, Texas. Became president of the National League of Cities in 1990.
 Henry Cisneros, former mayor of San Antonio, Texas
 Ted L. Ellis, mayor of Bluffton, Indiana
 Roman Gribbs, former mayor of Detroit, Michigan
 William B. Hartsfield, former mayor of Atlanta, Georgia
 James C. Hunt, former mayor of Clarksburg, West Virginia
 Cathy L. Reynolds, former city council president of Denver, Colorado
 Richard Lugar, former mayor of Indianapolis, Indiana
 Bart Peterson, former mayor of Indianapolis, Indiana
 Anthony A. Williams, former mayor of Washington, DC
 Terry Goddard, former mayor of Phoenix, AZ
 Tom Bradley, former mayor of Los Angeles
 Greg Lashutka, former mayor of Columbus, Ohio
 George Voinovich, former mayor of Cleveland, Ohio
 Ferd Harrison, former mayor of Scotland Neck, North Carolina
 James Mitchell, member of city council, Charlotte, North Carolina
 Tom Moody, former mayor of Columbus, Ohio
 Phyllis Lamphere, former city council president of Seattle, first woman and non-mayor to serve as president

Members
 Alabama League of Municipalities, Montgomery, Alabama
 Alaska Municipal League, Juneau, Alaska 
 League of Arizona Cities and Towns, Phoenix, Arizona 
 Arkansas Municipal League, North Little Rock, Arkansas 
 League of California Cities, Sacramento, California 
 Colorado Municipal League, Denver, Colorado 
 Connecticut Conference of Municipalities, New Haven, Connecticut 
 Delaware League of Local Governments, Dover, Delaware 
 Florida League of Cities, Tallahassee, Florida 
 Georgia Municipal Association, Atlanta, Georgia 
 Association of Idaho Cities, Boise, Idaho 
 Illinois Municipal League, Springfield, Illinois 
 Accelerate Indiana Municipalities, Indianapolis, Indiana 
 Iowa League of Cities, Des Moines, Iowa 
 League of Kansas Municipalities, Topeka, Kansas 
 Kentucky League of Cities, Lexington, Kentucky 
 Louisiana Municipal Association, Baton Rouge, Louisiana 
 Maine Municipal Association, Augusta, Maine 
 Maryland Municipal League, Annapolis, Maryland 
 Massachusetts Municipal Association, Boston, Massachusetts 
 Michigan Municipal League, Ann Arbor, Michigan 
 League of Minnesota Cities, St. Paul, Minnesota 
 Mississippi Municipal League, Jackson, Mississippi 
 Missouri Municipal League, Jefferson City, Missouri 
 Montana League of Cities and Towns
 League of Nebraska Municipalities, Lincoln, Nebraska 
 Nevada League of Cities and Municipalities, Carson City, Nevada 
 New Hampshire Municipal Association, Concord, New Hampshire 
 New Jersey State League of Municipalities, Trenton, New Jersey 
 New Mexico Municipal League, Santa Fe, New Mexico 
 New York State Conference of Mayors and Municipal Officials, Albany, New York 
 North Carolina League of Municipalities, Raleigh, North Carolina
 North Dakota League of Cities, Bismarck, North Dakota
 Ohio Municipal League, Columbus, Ohio 
 Oklahoma Municipal League, Oklahoma City, Oklahoma 
 League of Oregon Cities, Salem, Oregon 
 Pennsylvania Municipal League, Harrisburg, Pennsylvania
 Rhode Island League of Cities and Towns, Providence, Rhode Island 
 Municipal Association of South Carolina, Columbia, South Carolina 
 South Dakota Municipal League, Ft. Pierre, South Dakota 
 Tennessee Municipal League, Nashville, Tennessee 
 Texas Municipal League, Austin, Texas 
 Utah League of Cities and Towns, Salt Lake City, Utah 
 Vermont League of Cities and Towns, Montpelier, Vermont 
 Virginia Municipal League, Richmond, Virginia 
 Association of Washington Cities, Olympia, Washington 
 West Virginia Municipal League, Charleston, West Virginia 
 League of Wisconsin Municipalities, Madison, Wisconsin 
 Wyoming Association of Municipalities, Cheyenne, Wyoming

See also
Local government in the United States
United States Conference of Mayors
National Association of Counties
International City/County Management Association
National Governors Association
National Conference of State Legislatures
The Council of State Governments
Sister Cities International
List of micro-regional organizations

Further reading
 EPA Alumni Association, Protecting the Environment, A Half Century of Progress – an overview of EPA's environmental protection efforts over 50 years

References

External links 
National League of Cities
Leadership and past presidents
Institute for Youth, Education, and Families
NLC TV
Rose Center for Public Leadership, in partnership with the Urban Land Institute

Civic and political organizations of the United States
Local government organizations
Lobbying organizations based in Washington, D.C.
Cities in the United States
1926 establishments in the United States